Ashish Sehrawat (born 20 January 1995) is an Indian first-class cricketer who plays for Railways. He made his first-class debut for Railways in the 2016-17 Ranji Trophy on 29 November 2016. He made his List A debut on 25 September 2019, for Railways in the 2019–20 Vijay Hazare Trophy.

References

External links
 

1995 births
Living people
Indian cricketers
Railways cricketers